A Whistling Woman is a 2002 novel by A. S. Byatt. The novel was published by Chatto & Windus in 2002. 

The novel is the final in a sequence of four books, preceded by The Virgin in the Garden (1978), Still Life (1985), and Babel Tower (1996). Jonathan Walker, in a paper published by Contemporary Literature, referred to the series of books as the "Frederica quartet". Byatt herself expressed a preference for The Virgin in the Garden quartet when speaking about it ("It isn't Frederica's book--though she's the sort of person who would muscle in and try to take it!") and noted her publisher's intention to produce a boxed set, simply titled The Quartet.

Byatt has said the novel is "about utopianism...and a dangerous sort of mystical romanticism".

A Whistling Woman is half dedicated to Frances Ashcroft.

References

2002 British novels
Chatto & Windus books
Novels by A. S. Byatt
Novels set in the United Kingdom